Eucalyptus annuliformis, commonly known as the Badgerabbie mallee, is a rare mallee that is endemic to a small area in the south-west of Western Australia. It has smooth, greyish bark, elliptic to lance-shaped leaves when mature, oval flower buds, white flowers and hemispherical fruit with a broad disc.

Description
The leaves are the same dull green on both surfaces. The operculum is conical or slightly beaked. Flowering occurs from May to September and the flowers are white.

Taxonomy and naming
Eucalyptus annuliformis was first formally described in 1992 by Peter Grayling and Ian Brooker from a specimen collected near Dandaragan and the description was published in Nuytsia. The specific epithet (annuliformis) is said to be derived from the Latin annulus meaning "ring" and formis meaning "shape", referring to the disc of the fruit. In Latin, the word for "shape" is however forma and -formis means "-formed".

Distribution and habitat
Badgerabbie mallee is only known from Badgerabbie Hill near Dandaragan where it grows in woodland with a dense, low shrub layer.

Conservation
Eucalyptus annuliformis is classified as "Priority One" by the Government of Western Australia Department of Parks and Wildlife, meaning that it is known from only one or a few locations which are potentially at risk.

See also
List of Eucalyptus species

References

Eucalypts of Western Australia
annuliformis
Myrtales of Australia
Mallees (habit)
Plants described in 1992
Taxa named by Ian Brooker